The Honchō Tsugan (本朝通鑑), or Comprehensive Mirror of Japan, is a book on the history of Japan by Hayashi Razan and his successor Hayashi Gahō which was finished in 1670. It was written in Chinese and modeled after the Zizhi Tongjian. The whole work comprises 326 scrolls.

Background 
The work was finished at the Shūshikan (修史館), or Historiographic Institute, which was built for Gahō, who was also provided with enough rations (扶持 fuchi) for a research team of up to 95 men.

Scholarship 
The work, and Razan in particular, has been praised by Japanese scholars for its relatively dispassionate attempt at understanding history, leading some scholars to view Razan as "the founder of modern historical research" and "the beginning of modern scholarship" in Japan. The work was influential on the thought of Arai Hakuseki, who is considered to have been even more objective. Nonetheless, the work was by no means perfect, as Razan was under pressure from the times to hide his sceptical views of traditional Japanese religious myths (such as the Age of the Gods). As a result, he does not treat that subject in a critical manner as he does with other topics, and had to save his unorthodox views for private writings.

References

External links
卷首
第01册
第02册
第03册
第04册
第05册
第06册
第07册
第08册
第09册
第10册
第11册
第12册
第13册
第14册
第15册
第16册
第17册

Edo-period works

Confucianism in Japan
Kanbun
Edo-period history books